John Brown II may refer to:

John Carter Brown II (1797–1874), American book collector
John Nicholas Brown II (1900–1979), U.S. Assistant Secretary of the Navy

See also
John Browne II (c. 1513 – 1570), English member of parliament
John Brown Jr. (disambiguation)